The Kuwa is an Okinawan and Japanese weapon based on a hoe. It is used in Okinawan kobudō.

External links 
http://www.okinawanweapons.com/kuwa.html
http://www.ikigaiway.com/2009/kuwa-okinawan-hoe-and-tool-of-self-defense/

Weapons of Okinawa

ja:鍬#武術